Paul J. Tavares is an American former politician for the state of Rhode Island. He served in the East Providence City Council and the Rhode Island State Senate. He was elected Treasurer of Rhode Island in 1998. Paul's campaign motto was No tricks, no gimmicks, just a Treasurer who will do what is right. He served until 2006. Sheldon Whitehouse praised the CollegeBound fund, Rhode Island's 529 college savings program, which Tavares was instrumental in securing. He also served as the interim housing director for the Providence Housing Authority

Outside of politics, he was a banker. In  2011, he became a manager at East Providence Bank.

References

|-

Rhode Island state senators
State treasurers of Rhode Island
Living people
Year of birth missing (living people)